The 2016–17 season Independiente participated in the Primera División, Copa Sudamericana and continued in Copa Argentina from the previous season.

Club

Kits
 Supplier: Puma SE
 Main Sponsor::  Correo OCA /  
 Secondary Sponsor:  Audifarm Salud

Current squad

Last updated on May 22, 2016

Current coaching staff

{|class="wikitable"
|+
! style="background-color:white; color:black;" scope="col"|Position
! style="background-color:white; color:black;" scope="col"|Staff
|-

Transfers

Player In

Total spending:  : 1,900,000 $

Player Out 

Total Income  : 3,500,000 $

Pre-season

Competitions

Overall

Last updated on 21 June 2016

Overview

Last updated on 21 June 2016

Primera División

League table

Relegation

Results summary

Results by round

Copa Argentina

Round of 64
Continue from the Previous season

Round of 32

Copa Sudamericana

Second stage

Statistics

Squad statistics

Last updated on 21 June 2016

Goals

Last updated on 21 June 2016

Clean sheets

Last updated on 21 June 2016

Disciplinary record

Last updated on 21 June 2016

Overall

Last updated on 20 May 2016

References

External links
 Club Atlético Independiente 

Independiente
Club Atlético Independiente seasons